On March 20, 2021 at 18:09 JST (09:09 UTC). It had a maximum JMA intensity of Shindo 5+ while on the Mercalli intensity scale, it earned a rating of VII (Very strong). Power outages and some slight damage in Miyagi was reported.

A press release by the Japan Meteorological Agency stated that the earthquake was an aftershock of the 2011 Tōhoku earthquake and tsunami from ten years prior.

Earthquake 
The earthquake occurred as the result of thrust faulting near the subduction zone interface plate boundary between the Pacific and North America plates. Moment tensor solutions indicate that slip occurred either on a moderately dipping fault striking to the south, or a moderately dipping fault striking to the north-northeast, consistent with the east-west oriented compression expected in this region. It came just nine days after the tenth anniversary of the March 11, 2011 disaster, and just over a month since a  7.3 earthquake struck south of the March 20 event.

Intensity

Aftershocks

Impact
The earthquake caused 11 minor injuries in the prefectures of Iwate, Miyagi and Fukushima Many of the injured were from Miyagi Prefecture. Four individuals from Sendai, Miyagi endured slight injuries. In Morioka, Iwate, a woman fell and suffered cuts. Two elderly women aged 90 and 70 sustained minor head and shoulder injuries respectively when they were struck by furniture in Iwanuma, Miyagi. There was one injury each reported in Date, Ishinomaki, Kesennuma and Tōno.

Power outages were reported in some parts of Tohoku, forcing the suspension of bullet train services by the East Japan Railway Company. In Shiogama, a  wall supporting an inclined surface breached and collapsed during the earthquake.

As a precaution, authorities from the Tohoku Electric Power utility shut down the Onagawa Nuclear Power Plant whilst the Tokyo Electric Power Company checked the conditions at the Fukushima Daiichi Nuclear Power Plant. No radiation anomalies or changes in cooling water levels were detected at the power plant.

Tsunami warning
Despite the warnings, no tsunamis were observed; this is because the earthquake had ruptured a deeper portion of the subduction zone. The tsunami advisory was then withdrawn at around 19:30 JST.

Other events
On May 1, at 10:27 local time, a  6.9 or  6.6 earthquake struck the southern tip of the Oshika Peninsula. The earthquake had a depth of 47.3 km or 66 km and a maximum intensity of VI (Strong) or Shindo 5 upper. According to the Japan Meteorological Survey, the earthquake would not be considered an aftershock of the 2011 Great East Japan earthquake as such announcements had ceased as of April 1 of 2021. This is due to the decreasing rate of earthquakes which made it harder to determine if events like those of May 1 were actual aftershocks. The agency also could not determine if this event was related to the earthquake of March 20.

Minor damage including broken windows and a water pipe rupture was reported. The earthquake resulted in the suspension of Shinkansen services in the Tohoku region. In addition, three people sustained minor injuries. Two of the victims were using a hot spring at Onagawa Station when the quake struck and shattered window panels. A third individual from Soma City in Fukushima Prefecture fell while shopping at a supermarket and was taken to a hospital for treatment.

See also 

 List of earthquakes in 2021
 List of earthquakes in Japan
 2021 Fukushima earthquake
 April 2011 Miyagi earthquake
 2012 Kamaishi earthquake

References

External links 

 Japan Meteorological Agency (JMA) earthquake information

2021 earthquakes
Earthquakes in Japan
Earthquakes of the Reiwa period
March 2021 events in Japan
Tōhoku region
2021 earthquakes in Asia
2021 disasters in Japan